The men's 100 metre backstroke event at the 1996 Summer Olympics took place on 23 July at the Georgia Tech Aquatic Center in Atlanta, United States.

Records
Prior to this competition, the existing world and Olympic records were as follows.

Results

Heats
Rule: The eight fastest swimmers advance to final A (Q), while the next eight to final B (q).

Finals

Final B

Final A

References

External links
 Official Report
 USA Swimming

Swimming at the 1996 Summer Olympics
Men's events at the 1996 Summer Olympics